Guithelin was a legendary king of the Britons  as accounted by Geoffrey of Monmouth.  He became king after the death of Gurguit Barbtruc.

He ruled liberally and temperately for his life.  His Queen consort was an artisan and noblewoman named Marcia.  When he died, his wife took over the government as regent for their son, Sisillius II.

References

Legendary British kings